Isele Magazine is a literary magazine that publishes fiction, poetry, essays, interviews, and book reviews.

History 
Isele Magazine was founded in July 2020 by Nigerian novelist Ukamaka Olisakwe.

In an interview with Open Country Mag, she explained that the magazine is a tribute to late grandmother, alias 'Isele Nwanyi', who was a dancer and a performance poet.

The magazine published its first issue in July 2020 and made a call for submissions, inviting "writers and artists who hold a mirror to our society, who challenge conventional expectations about ways of being, how to be, and who decides who should be."

In October 2021, the magazine published a call for The Woman Issue, seeking submissions that "subvert the tropes and narratives associated with and definitive of womanhood."

References 

Online literary magazines
Magazines established in 2020
Online magazines published in Nigeria